The surdelina or sampogna was a kind of bag pipe which was described and illustrated by Mersenne as the musette de Naples; its construction was very complicated. Mersenne states that the instrument was invented by Jean Baptiste Riva (who was living in Paris in 1620), Dom Julio and Vincenze; but Mersenne seems to have made alterations himself in the original instrument, which are not very clearly explained. There were two chaunters with narrow cylindrical bore and having both finger-holes and keys; and two drones each having ten keys. The four pipes were fixed in the same stock, and double reeds were used throughout; the bag was inflated by means of bellows. Passenti of Venice published a collection of melodies for the zampogna in 1628, under the title of Canora Zampogna.

References

Italian musical instruments
Music in Naples
Bagpipes